Henriette Hansen is a former women's cricketer for the Denmark national women's cricket team who played six ODIs. She made her debut against Ireland during the 1995 Women's European Cricket Cup, when she scored was dismissed without scoring a run as a lower-order batsman. Two years later, she played twice during the 1997 Women's Cricket World Cup. Her highest score in international cricket was 8 runs, which made against the Netherlands  in 1995. In all, she scored 14 runs and took two catches for Denmark.

References

Danish women cricketers
Denmark women One Day International cricketers
Living people
Year of birth missing (living people)